Turbo is a port city in Antioquia Department, Colombia. It is located on the coast of Gulf of Urabá, 340 km north of Medellín (the department capital and second largest city). This port city is the capital of the Urabá region of Antioquia. The place where Turbo is today was known as Pisisí, but by 1741 people were already talking about Turbo. By a decree on May 11, 1839, the central government spent one thousand pesos for military service barracks in Turbo. In 1840, the republican president assigned one thousand fanegas of uncultivated lands for the new population. It was established as a municipality in 1847.

Turbo lies near the southeastern tip of the Darién Gap and is the northern terminus of the main route of the Pan-American Highway in South America. There is currently no paved road connecting through the region to Yaviza, Panama, where the highway continues through Central and North America.

Geography

Climate
The Köppen climate classification subtype for Turbo’s climate is Am (tropical monsoon climate), although it borders on Af (tropical rainforest climate). Rainfall in Turbo is heavy due to strong surface westerly winds from the Intertropical Convergence Zone (ITCZ) located near Turbo’s latitude, although it is much less from January to March when the ITCZ reaches its most southerly latitude, resulting in the town’s classification as a monsoon climate.

References

External links

Port cities in the Caribbean
Municipalities of Antioquia Department